City Temple can mean:

 Stadttempel, a synagogue in Vienna.
 City Temple (London), a free church on Holborn Viaduct.
 Salt Lake City Temple, a temple of LDS Church in Salt Lake City.
 City Temple Baptist Church in Philadelphia.
 The City Temple in Revelation 21:19-20.
 Salvation Army churches in many cities, including Brisbane, Canberra  and Melbourne.